Durva is an Indian television Marathi language serial aired on Star Pravah. The show was produced by Nitin Vaidya and Ninad Vaidya under the banner of Dashami Creations. The series aired from 18 March 2013 to 12 November 2016 with 1164 episodes.

Plot 
It is a story of two rivalry families- Patil and Kshirsagar fighting for political power in Satara. Durva, an innocent girl, gets married in the family to Bhupati, where everyone uses her to gain political prestige. Amongst this Durva fighting for her rights forms the crux of the story.

Cast 
 Hruta Durgule as Durva Bhupati Patil / Durva Keshav Sane
 Suyash Tilak as Bhupati Patil
 Harshad Atkari as Keshav Dada Sane
 Prasad Pandit as Patil Anna
 Ashwini Ekbote as Bhupati's Mother
 Hardeek Joshi as Purushottam Gokhale
 Uday Tikekar as Devkishan Sarda
 Shalmalee Tolye as Durva's sister-in- law
 Shruja Prabhudesai-Bangera as Mohini 
 Vinay Apte as Anna Patil 
 Sharad Ponkshe replaced Vinay as Anna Patil

Awards

References

External links 
 
 Durva at Hotstar

Marathi-language television shows
Star Pravah original programming
2013 Indian television series debuts
2016 Indian television series endings